Sobreira is the Portuguese and Galician name for the cork oak tree (Quercus suber), and may refer to:

People 
 Rafael Sobreira da Costa, Brazilian footballer

Places 
 Sobreira (Paredes), a parish in Paredes Municipality, Portugal

See also 
 Sobreiro (disambiguation)
 Sobral (disambiguation)
 Sobrado (disambiguation)